José Manuel de Sousa e Faro Nobre de Carvalho (5 September 1911 – 23 August 1988) was a Portuguese army brigadier-general and colonial administrator. He served as the 121st Governor of Macau from 1967 to 1974.

Biography
Nobre de Carvalho was born in Lisbon in 1911. He was mobilized for various service commissions in India, Cape Verde and Angola, where he served as Chief of Staff of the Governor General, and later, General Commander of the Public Security Police.

On 26 November 1967, he was appointed the Governor of Macau, replacing António Lopes dos Santos. In the same year, political demonstrations and rioting against Portuguese rule in Macau occurred, which was known as the 12-3 incident. On 29 January 1968, he signed a statement of apology under a portrait of Mao Zedong, placing Macau under the de facto control of the People's Republic of China. 

He attached importance to the development of Macau's industry, promoting a new policy based on industry as a basis for economic development. He also promoted the construction of a bridge connecting Macau Peninsula and Taipa. The bridge was completed on 5 October 1974 and named after him.

He left office as governor on 19 November 1974. He died on 23 August 1988 in Lisbon at the age of 77.

Honours
  Officer of Military Order of Aviz (8 June 1948)
  Commander of Military Order of Aviz (8 March 1961)
  Grand Officer of Military Order of Aviz (23 October 1967)

References

1911 births
1988 deaths
Governors of Macau
Portuguese colonial governors and administrators
People of Portuguese India
Colonial people in Angola
Portuguese generals
People from Lisbon
Officers of the Order of Aviz
Commanders of the Order of Aviz
Grand Officers of the Order of Aviz